Thomas Beck may refer to:

 Thomas Beck (actor) (1909–1995), American film and stage actor
 Thomas Beck (politician) (1819–?), politician in the Texas House of Representatives
 Thomas Alcock Beck (1795–1846), English historian
 Thomas Snow Beck (1814–1877), British doctor
 Thomas Beck (footballer) (born 1981), Liechtenstein football striker
 Thomas Beck (cricketer), English cricketer
 Thomas Beck (engineer) (1900–1948), New Zealand irrigation engineer best known for his work at the Rangitata Diversion Race

See also
 Thomas Bek (disambiguation)
 Tom Beck (disambiguation)